Aphrastobraconini is a tribe of wasps in the subfamily Braconinae.

References

External links 
 

 Aphrastobraconini at insectoid.info

Parasitica tribes
Braconinae